Spencer's river tree frog (Ranoidea spenceri), also known as Spencer's tree frog or spotted tree frog, is a species of frog in the subfamily Pelodryadinae.

It is endemic to Australia. Its natural habitats are subtropical or tropical moist lowland forest, subtropical or tropical moist montane forest, and rivers. It is threatened by habitat loss.

References

External links
 

Ranoidea (genus)
Amphibians described in 1984
Endemic fauna of Australia
Taxonomy articles created by Polbot
Frogs of Australia
Taxobox binomials not recognized by IUCN